Wilfred George Binnewies (September 18, 1879 – June 4, 1968) was an American football, basketball, and baseball coach.  He was the seventh head football coach at Illinois State University in Normal, Illinois, serving for two seasons, from 1908 to 1909, and compiling a record of 9–5–1.

References

External links
 

1879 births
1968 deaths
Basketball coaches from Illinois
Illinois State Redbirds baseball coaches
Illinois State Redbirds football coaches
Illinois State Redbirds men's basketball coaches
People from Harvard, Illinois
Sportspeople from the Chicago metropolitan area